Agonum permoestum is a species of ground beetle in the Platyninae subfamily that can be found in Bosnia and Herzegovina, Bulgaria, Croatia, France, Hungary, Italy, Portugal, Romania, Slovakia, Spain, Ukraine, Germany, and Greece. It is also common on European islands such as Balearic, Crete, Corsica, Malta, Sardinia, and Sicily.

References

Beetles described in 1938
Beetles of Europe
permoestum